Carla Ward (born 21 December 1983) is an English football coach and former midfielder who is the manager of Aston Villa in the FA Women's Super League.

Early life
Born on the Isle of Wight, Ward grew up on a council estate in Torquay where she learned to play football in the street.

Club career
After a season in Spain with Sporting Plaza de Argel, Ward joined Leeds United for 2007–08, but signed for Lincoln in December 2007. In summer 2009 Doncaster Rovers Belles beat competition from other Premier League clubs to secure Ward's signature, but she experienced a "change of heart" and returned to Lincoln after a few weeks. When Lincoln were accepted into the new FA WSL, Ward moved to Sheffield FC, initially on loan.

In November 2017, club captain Ward left Sheffield FC after more than 200 appearances and over 100 goals.

Managerial career

Sheffield United
In November 2017, Ward joined Sheffield United in the FA Women's Premier League Midlands Division One as player-assistant manager. She took over as interim manager on 17 January 2018 after Dan O'Hearne stepped down before being given the job on a permanent basis. In her first game as interim manager, United beat Birmingham & West Midlands 5–0 followed up with a 10–0 victory over Rotherham United. Ward was involved in the club's successful application to the FA Women's Championship. In total, Ward managed for 58 games, taking the team to a 5th place Championship finish in the 2018–19 season and a 2nd place finish in the 2019–20 season before mutually agreeing to depart in July 2020.

Birmingham City
In August 2020, Ward was appointed Birmingham City with the team in the middle of a rebuild having narrowly escaped relegation the season before and only retaining ten senior players following an offseason exodus. During her tenure, the players formally issued a list of complaints to the club's board, stating that the club was "preventing us from performing our jobs to the best of our ability." Concerns included lack of facilities, medical support and travel provisions. Ward was named to WSL Manager of the Year shortlist at the end of the season, steering the team away from relegation as Birmingham finishing 11th of 12 teams. On 14 May 2021, Ward announced her resignation effective as of the team's final game of the season on 16 May 2021.

Aston Villa
On 20 May 2021, Ward was appointed manager of FA WSL side Aston Villa.

Managerial statistics

Honours 
Individual

 FA Women's Super League Manager of the Month: September 2022, January 2023

References

External links
 

Living people
1980 births
English women's footballers
Expatriate women's footballers in Spain
English expatriate women's footballers
Women's association football midfielders
FA Women's National League players
Footballers from Devon
Notts County L.F.C. players
Sheffield F.C. Ladies players
Leeds United Women F.C. players
Doncaster Rovers Belles L.F.C. players
Bristol City W.F.C. players
Sheffield United W.F.C. players
Birmingham City W.F.C. players
Aston Villa W.F.C. players
English women's football managers
Footballers from the Isle of Wight
English expatriate sportspeople in Spain
Women's Super League managers
Sporting Plaza de Argel players
Birmingham City W.F.C. managers
Aston Villa W.F.C. managers
Sportspeople from Torquay